British Sri Lankans are an ethnic group referring to British people who can trace their ancestry to Sri Lanka. It can refer to a variety of ethnicities and races, including Sinhalese, Tamils, Moors/Muslims and Burghers.

History

Pre-Independent Ceylon 
Since the times of Ancient Greece and Ancient Rome, Sri Lanka historically had contact with Western Europe by being a stop on the highly profitable trade routes between the West and the East, whether through Arabic traders or directly through Western European traders. The term "serendipity" comes from the Latin word used by Romans for the island.

There may have contacts between Anglo-Saxon England and Sri Lanka as the rulers of East Anglia were part of an international culture stretching to the Baltic and far beyond. The objects discovered at Sutton Hoo included garnets, used in jewelry pieces, that may have come as far away as Sri Lanka and India. It has been assumed that the garnets from Sri Lanka to England at that time would have been passed through several hands in its journey. However, it shouldn't be underestimated for the individuals who can make long-distance journeys at that time as medieval Europeans have heard of India (possibly Sri Lanka as well) as King Alfred dispatched envoys to St Thomas and St Bartholomew shrines in Southern India in 833 AD (it isn't known whether they succeeded). Genetic studies showed that at least one individual with non-European ancestry was buried from 7th Century Kent, in England.

The first Western Europeans to make substantial contact with Sri Lanka were the Portuguese, followed by the Dutch and then finally the British. Sri Lankans have since been migrating to Britain for several centuries, up from the time of British ruled Ceylon.

There have been records of immigration from Ceylon to the UK during the 19th century. There are however no definitive records of the first Ceylonese to come to the UK. There was some presence of the Ceylonese during the 1810s. One notably, Adam Sri Munni Ratna, a Buddhist monk from Ceylon travelled to England in 1818 with his cousin while accompanying Sir Alexander Johnston to join the Church. However, they did not settle permanently in England and then returned to Ceylon where they entered government service. During the mid-late 19th century, many of the migrants from South Asia were the lascars who were sailors from British Colonies that worked on British ships and some of the sailors also come from the seafaring communities of Ceylon.

There were Ceylonese people from wealthy or high backgrounds who lived, studied and visited the UK during the 19th and early 20th centuries. These include people such as SWRD Bandaranaike, Sir John Kotelawala, Felix Reginald, Ananda Coomaraswamy and many others. Muthu Coomaraswamy, a Ceylon Tamil, became the first Asian knight after being knighted by Queen Victoria of the Order of St Michael and St George in 1878.

From the early 20th century, many people from Ceylon came to the UK as soldiers during WW1 when Ceylon sent 2,300 volunteers to the UK. There were also other reasons for Ceylonese migration to the UK before Independence. The Ceylonese also served as servants for wealthy British people such as Sir Thomas Lipton.

The UK censuses of 1891, 1901 and 1911 showed an amount of people born in the colonies of India and Ceylon. The 1901 census showed that out of the 136,092 persons born in British Dependencies and Colonies, no fewer than 55,362 persons were born in India, Burma or Ceylon with contrasting figures of 50,929 in 1891. The 1911 census however shown 66,331 or 41 per cent of people born in parts of the Empire with 62,974 from India and 3,557 from Ceylon.

Dominion of Ceylon to Republic of Sri Lanka 
Between the 1950s to the 1980s, the United Kingdom served as the major immigration destination for highly educated Sri Lankans, due to the relaxed immigration rules given to Sri Lankan citizens due to the politics surrounding post-Empire connections such as the Commonwealth of Nations.

This initial group of immigrants consisted of a very settled group of people who followed a migration model of a single journey with a settled home at the end of it. Many of these people who came are well-educated and very well off economically and have become established in British society.

During the 1960s, understaffing in the UK's National Health Service opened up the opportunity for many Sri Lankans to become doctors and consultants; others managed to secure other white-collar jobs.

Before 1983, when the Civil War started, social spaces for a Sri Lankan elite existed, there were hardly any ethnic boundaries and all ethnicities attended Sri Lankan High Commission receptions and the frequent intra-school sports competitions organized by Sri Lankan schools alumnae. During that time the public perceived the Sri Lankan community as one of the most successful immigrant communities in the UK. Especially during the 1970s, political organization increased among both Tamils and Sinhalese.

Civil War in Sri Lanka 
The onset of the Sri Lankan Civil War in the 1980s and 1990s caused a large-scale exodus of Tamils to countries in the West. The Sri Lankan Tamils who emigrated to the UK often came on student visas (or family reunion visas for the family of said people) due to the well-educated in Sri Lanka being literate in English. This resulted in the first generation diaspora falling into highly professional jobs such as medicine and law after studying at British educational facilities.

In 1991, Sri Lankans were the sixth biggest Asian community, with over 39,000 residents of Britain having been born in Sri Lanka.

The British-born Generation 
The children of first generation immigrants are a third grouping that have predominantly come-of-age in the late 2000s and 2010s. These children often grew up without siblings due to the low birth rates in the community, with one child for two parents being the norm, but they often faced better economic and cultural prospects than other similar refugee groups due to the strong education ethic imposed by Sri Lankan culture.

This grouping has been widely praised as hard-working, with little problems relating to criminality and anti-social behaviour, and high levels of educational achievement. A number of reports and articles has praised the community as "middle class" and "progressive".

Culture 
As Sri Lankans are similar to other South Asian communities in the UK it has often meant that Sri Lankans unknowingly assimilate into the local Asian cultures, particularly due to the small size of the Sri Lankan community, thanks to intermixing at shops and cultural centres such as temples.

Religion 
Sri Lankans in the United Kingdom predominantly come from Tamil heritage, which has led to a situation where Hinduism is more statistically prevalent among the community than Buddhism.

Hinduism nevertheless continues to be a cultural rallying point for most Sri Lankan Tamils. A number of temples have been built throughout the UK in order to service the needs of Sri Lankan Tamils, including the Sivan Kovil and Murugan Kovil in West London, though these temples do not necessarily serve as community building organisations due to Hinduism's lack of requirement for temple visits. The community mainly follow the Saivite sect.

The smaller Sinhalese community has also been well served by a large network of Buddhist temples, including a major Sinhalese one at Kingsbury in London called Vihara, and six other prominent Sinhalese temples that have been ethnically linked to the community. "Though present London Buddhist Vihāra traces its birth to 1926, until the arrival of three Sri Lankan monks as residents in 1928, the premises in Ealing seems to have functioned as Headquarters of British Maha Bodhi Society."

The religious breakdown of British Sri Lankans overall:

Demographics 

The population of England, Scotland and Wales born in what was then Ceylon recorded by the first post-war census of 1951 was 6,447 individuals. While the 1971 census grew to 17,045, this figure grew to 26,172 in 1981 and 39,387 in 1991. The 2001 Census recorded 67,938 Sri Lankan-born UK residents. The 2011 census recorded 125,917 Sri Lankan-born residents in England, 1,325 in Wales, 1,711 in Scotland and 123 in Northern Ireland. The Tamil Information Centre had estimated that, as of 2007, 170,000 Sri Lankans were resident in the UK.

The largest community of Sri Lanka born immigrants live in London, with an estimated population of around 50,000 in 2001 and 84,500 in 2011, with smaller populations in South East England, the East of England, West and East Midlands.

Tamils 

The UK has always had a strong, albeit small, population of Sri Lankan Tamils deriving from colonial era immigration between Sri Lanka and the UK, but a surge in emigration from Sri Lanka took place after 1983, as the civil war caused living conditions deteriorate and placed many inhabitants in danger. It is now estimated that the current population of British Sri Lankan Tamils numbers around 100,000 to 200,000.

The largest population of British Sri Lankan Tamils can be found in London, chiefly in Harrow (West London) and Tooting (South London). The community generally has far lower birth rates in comparison to other South Asian ethnic groups, with one child for two parents being the norm.

Unlike immigrants to countries in Continental Europe, the majority of Sri Lankan Tamils that went to live in Anglo-Saxon countries achieved entry through non-refugee methods such as educational visas and family reunion visas, owing to the highly educated in Sri Lanka being literate in English as well as Tamil. This resulted in the first generation diaspora falling into highly professional jobs such as medicine and law after studying at British educational facilities.

The result was that the community was perceived as being similar to the rest of the Indian community (see:Ugandan Indian Refugees) with a more middle class image.

Sinhalese 
The main and oldest organisation representing the Sinhalese community in the UK are the UK Sinhala association. The newspaper Lanka Viththi was created in 1997 to provide a Sinhala newspaper for the Sinhalese community. In 2006, a Sinhala TV channel called Kesara TV was set up in London to provide the Sinhala speaking people of the UK a TV channel in Sinhala.

The current Sinhalese community in the UK has arrived over the past 70 years since the end of the colonial era in Ceylon. They represent at least 3 generations with each of them being the immigrants, their children, and grandchildren.

Muslims 
There are about 25,000+ Sri Lankan Muslims living in the United Kingdom.

Notable British Sri Lankans 

Romesh Ranganathan, stand-up comedian, actor and presenter
Ashan Pillai, violist and professor of viola
Ranil Jayawardena, Secretary of State for Environment, Food and Rural Affairs (2022), Member of Parliament for North East Hampshire (2015–present)
M.I.A. (rapper)

References

External links 
 UK in Sri Lanka
 Diaspora Communities and Civil Conflict Transformation
 Tamils in the UK

Asian diaspora in the United Kingdom
 
Sri Lankan diaspora
Immigration to the United Kingdom by country of origin